Paenochrobactrum gallinarii is a bacterium of the genus Paenochrobactrum which was isolated from air of a duck barn in Berlin.

References

External links
Type strain of Paenochrobactrum gallinarii at BacDive -  the Bacterial Diversity Metadatabase

Hyphomicrobiales
Bacteria described in 2010